Triodia may refer to:

 Triodia (moth), a genus of moths of the family Hepialidae
 Triodia (plant), a genus of grasses in the family Poaceae